Jamie McGonigle (born 5 March 1996) is a Northern Irish professional footballer who plays for League of Ireland club Derry City.

Starting his career with Dungiven Celtic, McGonigle moved to Coleraine in 2015. After scoring 65 goals in 179 appearances, he signed for Crusaders in August 2019 for a Northern Irish transfer record fee of £60,000. He scored the fastest hattrick in an Irish league competition, only taking him 3 minutes.

Club career

Coleraine
McGonigle began his career playing in the lower leagues for hometown club Dungiven Celtic. After impressing, he moved to Coleraine in 2014, and after scoring 30 goals for the reserve team, made his debut for the senior team against Institute in January 2015.

By October 2017, he had scored against every club in the top flight, and his 16 league goals that season took Coleraine to second place in the league. He also helped the side to win the Irish Cup, playing in the 3-1 final victory over Cliftonville, and was named in the NIFL Team of the Year. He scored a total of 65 goals in 179 games for the Bannsiders.

Crusaders
McGonigle signed for Crusaders on 8 August 2019. The fee of £60,000 broke the Northern Irish transfer fee record, passing the previous record of £55,000 which had stood since Glenn Ferguson's transfer to Linfield from Glenavon in 1998. McGonigle scored his first goals by scoring five, including a hat-trick in less than three minutes, in an 8-1 victory over Sirocco Works on 10 September 2019.

Derry City
McGonigle then signed for Derry City on 29 June 2021 for a rumoured fee of £35,000. McGonigle made his Derry City debut in a 2–0 win over Waterford on 2 July 2021 at the Ryan McBride Brandywell Stadium. McGonigle netted his first goal for the club in a 3-0 win over Drogheda United a month later. He netted a crucial goal in a 2-1 win over Dundalk in the final game of the season which secured a 4th place finish and European football for his side. Ahead of the 2022 season, McGonigle was handed the number 9 shirt. On 25 February 2022, McGonigle became the first Derry player since Alex Krstic in 1986 to score in 5 games in a row for Derry City in a 2-1 victory in injury time against Shamrock Rovers. On 18 March 2022, he signed a new contract with the club until the end of the 2025 season. McGonigle also bagged his first hat-trick for Derry in a 7-1 victory against UCD on 22 April 2022. He was named League of Ireland Player of the Month for April 2022 after scoring 5 goals in the month.

International career
McGonigle earned five caps for the Northern Ireland U21 side, having received his first call-up in 2017.

Career statistics
As of 22 November 2022.

Honours
Coleraine
Irish Cup: 2017–18

Derry City
FAI Cup: 2022

References

1996 births
Living people
People from Dungiven
Coleraine F.C. players
Crusaders F.C. players
NIFL Premiership players
Association football forwards
Association footballers from Northern Ireland
Northern Ireland under-21 international footballers